South Grand Lake Regional Airport  is a town owned, public use airport located one nautical mile (2 km) northeast of the central business district of Ketchum, a town in Craig County, Oklahoma, United States. It is included in the National Plan of Integrated Airport Systems for 2011–2015, which categorized it as a general aviation facility.

Facilities and aircraft 
For the 12-month period ending December 1, 2010, the airport had 7,500 general aviation aircraft operations, an average of 20 per day.

References

External links 
 South Grand Lake Regional Airport (1K8) at Oklahoma Aeronautics Commission
 

Airports in Oklahoma
Buildings and structures in Craig County, Oklahoma